Animal Biology is a peer-reviewed scientific journal in the field of zoology. It is the official journal of the Koninklijke Nederlandse Dierkundige Vereniging (Royal Dutch Zoological Society) and published on behalf of the society by Brill Publishers. The journal was established in 1872 as the Archives Néerlandaises de Zoologie and renamed Netherlands Journal of Zoology in 1967. It has been known under its current name since 2004.

Abstracting and indexing 
According to the Journal Citation Reports, the journal's 2010 impact factor is 0.879 and it is indexed in BIOSIS, CABS, Current Contents/Agriculture, Biology and Environmental Sciences, FISHLIT, GeoAbstracts, Science Citation Index, and Scopus.''

References

External links 
 

Zoology journals
Publications established in 1872
Quarterly journals
English-language journals
Brill Publishers academic journals
Academic journals associated with learned and professional societies